Ruhgam, also rendered as Rohgam, may refer to:
 Ruhgam-e Bala
 Ruhgam-e Pain